Sant Andreu Jazz Band is a youth jazz band from Barcelona, featuring 7- to 20-year-olds. The bandleader is Joan Chamorro.

History
The band was founded in 2006 at Escola Municipal de Música de Sant Andreu. The band has performed at numerous concerts and festivals in Catalonia, and other regions of Spain as well as in neighbouring countries. They released their first live CD/DVD Jazzing: Live at Casa Fuster in 2009, featuring alongside established jazz musicians,  the precocious 14-year-old, Andrea Motis among other young talents.

2010 was a breakthrough year for the band, with appearances at more than 20 festivals including Valls, Terrassa, Girona, Barcelona, Platja d'Aro, and venues like el Jamboree, Palau de la Música Catalana, JazzSi, Hotel Casa Fuster, featuring international performers like Dick Oatts, Ken Peplowski, Bobby Gordon, Perico Sambeat, Ignasi Terraza, Matthew Simon, and Esteve Pi. The band also released their second recording Jazzing vol.2.

In 2012 the film director Ramón Tort made the documentary A film about kids and music based on the band's work and efforts. The film was awarded best feature film at the Lights. Camera. Help. festival in Austin, Texas, US in 2013.

Discography

2009: Jazzing 1 (Live at Casa Fuster Barcelona)
2011: Jazzing 2
2012: Jazzing 3 Live at el Palau de la Música  (featuring Terell Staford, Wycliffe Gordon, Jesse Davis, Ricard Gili, Josep Traver and Esteve Pi)
2012 A film about Kids and Music Sant Andreu Jazz Band
2014: Jazzing 4 vol. 1 and 2  (two CDs) (with Dick Oatts, Scott Robinson, Scott Hamilton, Victor Correa, Ricard Gili and Ignasi Terraza)
2015: Jazzing 5 (featuring  Scott Robinson, Dick Oatts, Perico Sambeat, Ignasi Terraza, Josep Traver, Esteve Pi, Josep Maria Farràs, Toni Belenguer and Curro Gálvez)
2016: Jazzing 6 vol. 1 and 2 (two CDs) (featuring John Allred, Joel Frahm, Luigi Grasso, Jon-Erik Kellso, Ignasi Terraza, Josep Traver and Esteve Pi)
2017: Jazzing 7 (featuring Luigi Grasso, Enrique Oliver, Ignasi Terraza, Josep Traver, Esteve Pi, Toni Belenguer, Eva Fernández and Magali Datzira)
2018: Jazzing 8 vol. 1 + 2 + 3 (three CDs) (featuring Perico Sambeat, Luigi Grasso, Joe Magnarelli, Fredrik Norén, Christoph Mallinger, Andrea Motis, Pasquale Grasso, Luca Pisani, Ignasi Terraza, Josep Traver and Esteve Pi)
2019: Jazzing 9 vol. 1 + 2
2020: Jazzing 9 vol. 3
2020: Jazzing 10 vol. 1 + 2 + 3 (three CDs)
2021: Jazzzing 11 vol. 1
2022: Jazzing 11 vol. 2 + 3 small groups at the jazz house
2022: Jazzing 11 vol. 4 la magia de la veu
2022: Jazzing 12 vol. 1 + 2

References

External links

 Homepage (catalan)
 http://santandreujazzband.blogspot.com/ (catalan)
 Garry Berman: Series of articles about Sant Andreu Jazz Band Medium (website)

Jazz music education
Musical groups from Catalonia